The 1990 edition of The Winston was a stock car racing competition that took place on May 20, 1990. Held at Charlotte Motor Speedway in Concord, North Carolina, the 70-lap race was an exhibition race in the 1990 NASCAR Winston Cup Series. He also became the first two-time winner of The Winston.

Unlike the previous two events, which ran for 135 laps and three segments each, this race used a 70-lap, two-segment format.

Background

The Winston was open to race winners from last season through the 1990 Winston 500 at Talladega Superspeedway. Because the field did not meet the minimum requirement of 19 cars, the remaining spots were awarded to the most recent winning drivers prior to the 1988 season. Neil Bonnett was eligible for this race, but had to bow out due to an injury he sustained at Darlington on April 1. As a result, his eligibility was given to Morgan Shepherd.

1990 The Winston drivers and eligibility

Race winners in 1989 and 1990
1-Terry Labonte (2 wins in 1989)
3-Dale Earnhardt (8 wins from 1989 and 1990)
5-Ricky Rudd (1 win in 1989)
6-Mark Martin (2 wins from 1989 and 1990)
9-Bill Elliott (3 wins in 1989)
10-Derrike Cope (2 wins in 1990, including the 1990 Daytona 500)
11-Geoff Bodine (2 wins from 1989 and 1990)
17-Darrell Waltrip (6 wins in 1989, including the 1989 Daytona 500)
25-Ken Schrader (1 win in 1989)
26-Brett Bodine (1 win in 1990)
27-Rusty Wallace (6 wins in 1989)
28-Davey Allison (3 wins from 1989 and 1990)
33-Harry Gant (1 win in 1989)
42-Kyle Petty (1 win in 1990

Race winners from previous years, not eligible by the above criteria
7-Alan Kulwicki (1 win in 1988)
8-Bobby Hillin Jr. (1 win in 1986)
15-Morgan Shepherd (1 win in 1986)
73-Phil Parsons (1 win in 1988)
83-Lake Speed (1 win in 1988)

Winner of The Winston Open
66-Dick Trickle

Race summary

Segment 1 (50 laps)
Dale Earnhardt won the pole while Davey Allison took the outside pole. Dick Trickle made the starting grid by winning the Winston Open after beating Rob Moroso by a margin of only eight inches. Allison and Bill Elliott served as the onboard camera cars throughout the race. As the green flag dropped, Earnhardt charged forward while Darrell Waltrip overtook Allison for second place. By the fifth lap, Mark Martin took second place from Waltrip and set his sights on Earnhardt. On lap 8, defending champion Rusty Wallace retired from the race after his engine expired. Segment 1 ended with Earnhardt taking the checkered flag while leading all 50 laps.

Race 1 results
3-Dale Earnhardt
9-Bill Elliott
6-Mark Martin
25-Ken Schrader
7-Alan Kulwicki

Segment 2 (20 laps)
Earnhardt led the field on the second segment. Elliott suddenly lost momentum as Martin, Alan Kulwicki, and Ken Schrader passed him. The caution flag waved on lap 54 after NASCAR officials spotted oil on turns one and two. On the restart, Schrader challenged Martin for second place with Elliott close behind them while Trickle and Allison fought Kulwicki for fifth place.

References

Winston, The
Winston, The
Winston, The
NASCAR races at Charlotte Motor Speedway
NASCAR All-Star Race